John Robert Harrell (born November 27, 1947) is a former catcher in Major League Baseball. He played for the San Francisco Giants in 1969.

References

External links

1947 births
Living people
Major League Baseball catchers
San Francisco Giants players
Magic Valley Cowboys players
Baseball players from Long Beach, California
West Valley Vikings baseball players
Arizona Instructional League Giants players
Amarillo Giants players
Decatur Commodores players
Evansville Triplets players
Fresno Giants players
Phoenix Giants players
Salt Lake City Angels players
Stockton Ports players